Glen Roy (also known as Glenroy) is an unincorporated community in Coal Township, Jackson County, Ohio, United States.

History
The community was laid out and founded by Andrew Roy, Ohio's first chief mining inspector. The Glen Roy post office was established on January 2, 1883.  The name was changed to Glenroy on July 12, 1893, and the post office ultimately closed on July 30, 1921.  Mail service is now handled through the Coalton branch.

Notable Person
Lefty James, MLB pitcher

References

Unincorporated communities in Jackson County, Ohio